Lykketoppen, occasionally anglicized as Lykke Peak, is a snow-covered,  tall summit that surmounts the southwest part of Bouvetøya, standing  east of Norvegia Point. It was first roughly charted in 1898 by a German expedition under Carl Chun, and was recharted and named in December 1927 by the First Norvegia Expedition under Captain Harald Horntvedt.

References

 

Mountains of Bouvet Island